is a Japanese football player who plays as a defender for Veertien Mie.

Club statistics
Updated to 20 February 2020.

References

External links

Profile at FC Gifu 

1986 births
Living people
Yokkaichi University alumni
Association football people from Mie Prefecture
Japanese footballers
J2 League players
Japan Football League players
FC Gifu players
Vanraure Hachinohe players
Veertien Mie players
Association football defenders